This is a list of electricity-generating power stations in the U.S. state of Arkansas, separated by fuel type.  In 2021, Arkansas had a summer capacity of 14,832 megawatts, and a net generation of 61,100 gigawatt-hours. The corresponding electrical energy generation mix in 2021 was 35.5% coal, 32% natural gas, 22.5% nuclear, 7.3% hydroelectric, 1.6% biomass, 1% solar, and 0.1% petroleum.

Biogas

Coal

Hydroelectric

Pumped storage

Natural gas

Natural gas/petroleum

Nuclear

Petroleum

Solar photovoltaic

Storage

Proposed power stations

Retired power stations

See also

List of public utilities in Arkansas
Energy in Arkansas

References

External links
Arkansas at the U.S. Energy Information Administration

Arkansas
Power